Marviel Underwood (born February 17, 1982) is a former American football safety. He was drafted by the Green Bay Packers in the fourth round of the 2005 NFL Draft. He played college football at San Diego State.

Underwood was also a member of the Denver Broncos, Oakland Raiders, and California Redwoods.

Early years
Underwood attended San Leandro High School in San Leandro, California, where he earned numerous local awards, including All-Hayward Area Athletic League first-team honors as both a running back (1998 and 1999) and cornerback (1999).  In his senior year, he rushed for 1,300 yards and 18 touchdowns, had 3 touchdowns on 4 interceptions, and returned 2 kickoffs for touchdowns.

His school's rivalry was with Bishop O'Dowd High School. Ironically, linebacker Kirk Morrison attended Bishop O'Dowd. The two would later attend San Diego State.

College career
At San Diego State, Underwood was named honorable mention All-Mountain West Conference his junior and senior seasons.   He finished his college career with 222 tackles (135 solo), 1 sack, 8 tackles for loss, 3 forced fumbles, 2 fumble recoveries, and 1 touchdown on 7 interceptions.

While at San Diego State, Underwood help create an Aztec Defence with Kirk Morrison of the Oakland Raiders, Matt McCoy of the Tampa Bay Buccaneers, Heath Farwell of the Minnesota Vikings, and Jonathan Bailes.

Professional career

Green Bay Packers
Marviel was selected in the 4th round (115th pick overall) of the 2005 NFL Draft by the Green Bay Packers.  In July 2005, he agreed to a four-year contract with the Packers, which included a $430,000 signing bonus.   His 2006 salary cap value was $457,500.

Backing up his fellow rookie-teammate Nick Collins, Underwood appeared in all 16 regular-season games during the 2005 season. Misfortune hit Underwood when he tore two ligaments in his right knee in a preseason game against the San Diego Chargers. He missed the 2006 NFL season after being placed on injured reserve. On August 20, 2007 the Packers released Underwood.

After spending over two months as a free agent, Underwood was re-signed by the Packers on November 25 when defensive tackle Colin Cole was placed on injured reserve. Although Underwood wore No. 25 during his first two seasons in Green Bay, the number was taken by running back Ryan Grant after Underwood's release. Upon his re-signing, Underwood was assigned No. 43.

The following week, Underwood was released again when quarterback Craig Nall was re-signed due to an injury to Brett Favre.

Denver Broncos
On December 5, 2007, Underwood signed with the Denver Broncos. He was waived by the team on May 28, 2008.

Oakland Raiders
Underwood was signed by the Oakland Raiders on August 25, 2008. He was waived by the team on August 30.

California Redwoods
Underwood was drafted by the California Redwoods of the United Football League in the UFL Premiere Season Draft in 2009. He signed with the team on September 2. He was placed on injured reserve on November 5.

References

External links
Just Sports Stats
Oakland Raiders bio
United Football League bio

1982 births
Living people
Players of American football from Oakland, California
American football safeties
San Diego State Aztecs football players
Green Bay Packers players
Denver Broncos players
Oakland Raiders players
Sacramento Mountain Lions players